The reverse pebblesnail, scientific name Somatogyrus alcoviensis, is a species of small freshwater snail with a gill and an operculum,  an aquatic gastropod mollusc in the family Hydrobiidae.

This species is endemic to Newton County, Georgia in the United States, where it occurs in the Alocvy and Yellow Rivers.  It was believed extinct until it was rediscovered in a 2000 survey.

References

Somatogyrus
Taxonomy articles created by Polbot
Endemic fauna of Georgia (U.S. state)